Alfred Roy Wise (7 July 1901 – 21 August 1974) was a British Conservative Party politician and was the Member of Parliament for the constituencies of Rugby and Smethwick .

Biography
He was born on 7 July 1901 to Alfred Gascoyne Wise and Augusta Frances Nugent. His father was a judge for the Supreme Court of Hong Kong, and his brother was Percival Kinnear Wise.

He married Cassandra Coke and had one son, Group Captain Adam Nugent Wise LVO MBE RAF, born 1943.

He was elected to the House of Commons at the 1931 general election as Member of Parliament (MP) for Smethwick, holding the seat until his defeat in the Labour landslide at the 1945 general election, when he contested Epping, replacing the Conservative candidature of Prime Minister Winston Churchill who had transferred to the new seat of Woodford.  He returned to the House of Commons at the 1959 general election as MP for Rugby, winning the seat from the sitting Labour  MP James Johnson with a majority of only 407.

Wise was re-elected at the 1964 election with a slightly increased majority of 1,689. However, at the 1966 general election he lost the seat to the Labour candidate, William Price by a margin of only 409 votes.

He died on 21 August 1974.

Electoral history

References

External links 
 

1901 births
1974 deaths
Conservative Party (UK) MPs for English constituencies
UK MPs 1959–1964
UK MPs 1964–1966
UK MPs 1931–1935
UK MPs 1935–1945